The 1910 Berlin International Tournament was the third and last edition of the Berlin International Tournament, an international ice hockey tournament. It was held from February 10-12, 1910, in Berlin, Germany. The tournament was won by Club des Patineurs de Paris from France.

Tournament

First round

Semifinals

Final

References

External links
 Tournament on hockeyarchives.info

Berlin
Berlin International Tournament
1909–10 in German ice hockey